Elections to the Rajasthan Legislative Assembly were held in June 1977, to elect members of the 200 constituencies in Rajasthan, India. The Janata Party won a majority of seats as well as the popular vote, and its leader, Bhairon Singh Shekhawat was appointed as the Chief Minister of Rajasthan.

After the passing of The Delimitation of Parliamentary and Assembly Constituencies Order, 1976, Rajasthan's Legslative Assembly was assigned 200 constituencies.

Result

Elected Members

See also 
 List of constituencies of the Rajasthan Legislative Assembly
 1977 elections in India

References

Rajasthan
1977
1977